Maxime Potvin (born 3 August 1987) is a Canadian taekwondo practitioner. He is a former World Championships silver medalist. In 2015, he was named to Canada's team at the 2015 Pan American Games that were held in Toronto where he received a silver medal.

References

1987 births
Living people
Canadian male taekwondo practitioners
Pan American Games silver medalists for Canada
Taekwondo practitioners at the 2015 Pan American Games
Pan American Games medalists in taekwondo
World Taekwondo Championships medalists
Medalists at the 2015 Pan American Games
21st-century Canadian people